WECT (channel 6) is a television station in Wilmington, North Carolina, United States, affiliated with NBC. It is owned by Gray Television, which provides certain services to Fox affiliate WSFX-TV (channel 26) under a shared services agreement (SSA) with American Spirit Media. Both stations share studios on Shipyard Boulevard in Wilmington, while WECT's transmitter is located near Winnabow, North Carolina.

History

Channel 6 began broadcasting on April 9, 1954, with the call sign WMFD-TV. It aired an analog signal on VHF channel 6 from a 941-foot transmitter near Delco. The station was owned by Atlantic Telecasting Corporation alongside Wilmington's oldest radio station, WMFD. Atlantic Telecasting sold off the radio station in 1958 and changed the television station's calls changed to the current WECT. The WMFD-TV call letters are now used by an independent television station in Mansfield, Ohio.

At its launch, channel 6 was affiliated with all four networks of the day—NBC, CBS, DuMont and ABC. However, it has always been a primary NBC affiliate. It lost DuMont when that network went silent in 1956. The station finally got local competition in 1964 when WWAY signed on. However, WWAY opted to affiliate with the much weaker ABC, forcing WECT to shoehorn NBC and CBS onto its schedule until the 1970s, when cable arrived in the Wilmington market. It primarily carried CBS soap operas and CBS' Sunday afternoon NFL coverage. At one point, this station was carried on cable systems in the Triangle region of North Carolina (Raleigh, Durham, Fayetteville, and Chapel Hill) for a time when NBC did not have a full-time affiliate in that market. At one time, WECT had a Fayetteville news bureau.

From the 1970s to the 1980s, WECT was picked up by numerous cable systems from Fayetteville eastward. At one point, it was carried on cable as far west as Wadesboro and as far north as Greenville. Due to its longstanding popularity, WECT is still carried on cable systems in the eastern portion of the Triangle market, including Fayetteville and Southern Pines. It is also available on cable in Jacksonville, which is part of the Greenville–Washington–New Bern market.

For its first half-century on the air, the station served as the default NBC affiliate for the northern and eastern portions of the Florence–Myrtle Beach, South Carolina market, including Myrtle Beach itself. That market was one of the last on the East Coast without its own NBC affiliate. It was carried on cable as far south as Georgetown, South Carolina. Well into the 1990s, it identified as "Wilmington/Myrtle Beach" to acknowledge its viewership on the Grand Strand. However, WECT's signal was somewhat weak on the North Carolina side of the market, such as Laurinburg.

Atlantic Telecasting sold the station to the News-Press & Gazette Company in 1986. That company then sold its entire station group to the first incarnation of New Vision Television in 1993. New Vision turned around and sold its entire group to Ellis Communications in 1995. Ellis was folded into Raycom Media in 1997. In 2006, Raycom bought out the Liberty Corporation, owner of WWAY. However, FCC duopoly rules forced Raycom to spin off WWAY to Morris Multimedia as a condition of the Raycom–Liberty merger.

On May 8, 2008, the FCC announced that five stations in Wilmington (including WECT) had agreed to voluntarily cease analog broadcasting on September 8  five months ahead of the February 17, 2009, tentative date for television stations to complete the analog-to-digital transition. The market was used by the FCC as a pre-transition test market. After the digital transition, WGNI radio agreed to air emergency weather information from WECT. Previously, because channel 6 is adjacent to the FM band, its broadcasts could be heard on FM 87.7.

WECT's coverage has been reduced as a result of the digital transition which left the station on UHF. The station's former transmitter was located in Bladen County, approximately halfway between Wilmington and Fayetteville. While Myrtle Beach itself is just outside the fringe area for the digital signal, North Myrtle Beach is just inside it. The southern and western portions of the Florence–Myrtle Beach market were served by another Raycom station, WIS in Columbia.

On August 8, 2008, Raycom signed-on WMBF-TV, a new digital-only NBC affiliate in Myrtle Beach covering the 2008 Summer Olympics in Beijing as part of its first network programming. Due to FCC regulations, WECT disappeared from most cable systems in the Florence/Myrtle Beach market when WMBF signed on. For longtime viewers, this was controversial as this station had been on cable systems in Laurinburg and Lumberton for decades. On December 1, 2008, WECT returned to the Time Warner Cable lineup in Lumberton, but was placed in the digital tier.

This station is one of the few NBC affiliates that refused to air Poker After Dark. In 2012, Raycom gave the station's defunct analog transmitter site to the Green Beret Foundation. On September 20, 2012, the tower, which was built in 1969 and was among the tallest man-made structures east of the Mississippi River, was imploded. At the time it was the tallest-ever man-made structure leveled via explosive demolition. Plans called for the scrap metal and the  site to be sold to benefit the foundation.

Sale to Gray Television
On June 25, 2018, Atlanta-based Gray Television announced it had reached an agreement to merge with Raycom, with Gray as the surviving company. The cash-and-stock merger transaction valued at $3.6 billion – in which Gray shareholders would acquire preferred stock currently held by Raycom – made WECT a sister station to fellow NBC affiliate WITN-TV in Washington. WITN-TV and WECT had briefly been sister stations when Raycom was formed in 1997. However, Raycom was forced to sell WITN to Gray in 1997 because WITN's signal has city-grade quality in the northern portion of the Wilmington market. At the time, the FCC normally did not allow one company to own two stations with overlapping signals, and would not even consider a waiver for a city-grade overlap. The sale was approved on December 20 and completed on January 2, 2019.

Programming

Syndicated programming
Syndicated programming on WECT includes Wheel of Fortune, Jeopardy! (both of which formerly aired on WWAY until 1992), The Ellen DeGeneres Show, and Live with Kelly and Ryan.

News operation

On September 22, 2003, through a news share agreement, WECT began producing a nightly half-hour prime time newscast on WSFX (Fox 26 News at 10 (now Fox Wilmington News at 10)). This was eventually joined by an sixty-minute extension of WECT's weekday morning show on September 13, 2006, called Carolina in the Morning on Fox 26 (now Carolina in the Morning on Fox Wilmington), seen from 7 until 8 on WSFX offering an alternative to the national morning shows seen on the market's big three network-affiliated stations.

On August 31, 2008, WECT became Wilmington's first television outlet to upgrade local news production to high definition level and the broadcasts on WSFX were included in the change. At some point in time, WECT added a third newscast to WSFX, under the title Fox 26 News at 6:30 (later became Fox Wilmington News at 6:30). It only aired on weeknights and attempted to compete against the national evening newscasts seen on the big three networks. It would be cancelled by the end of 2013 in preparation to expand the weeknight edition of the 10 o'clock show to an hour (which occurred on January 15, 2014).

After WWAY stopped producing weekend evening newscasts on August 1, 2009, WECT and WSFX became the only outlets in Wilmington to offer evening broadcasts seen seven nights a week. Although WWAY eventually reintroduced a local newscast airing Sunday nights at 11, WECT and WSFX remain the only channels in the market to air newscasts throughout the weekend. All newscasts on WSFX air from WECT's primary set but with modified duratrans indicating the Fox-branded shows.

Subchannels
The station's digital signal is multiplexed:

Prior to September 26, 2012, WECT-DT2 aired a 24-hour local weather channel with the branding "WECT Plus". The subchannel also aired repeats of the main channel's weeknight 6 and 11 p.m. newscasts as well as local traffic and travel information. Occasionally, other special programming aired on WECT-DT2. From April 15, 2005, until the end of December 2008, WECT-DT2 carried the defunct NBC Weather Plus. WECT replaced the local weather channel with Bounce TV on August 18, 2014.

Escape (now Ion Mystery) was added to a new subchannel.

References

External links

Gray Television
NBC network affiliates
Bounce TV affiliates
Circle (TV network) affiliates
Laff (TV network) affiliates
Ion Mystery affiliates
Television channels and stations established in 1954
ECT
1954 establishments in North Carolina